The Demographics of Gabon is the makeup of the population of Gabon. As of 2020, Gabon has a population of 2,225,287. Gabon's population is relatively young with 35.5% of its population under 15 years of age and only 4.3% of its population over 65 years old. Gabon has a nearly even split between males and females with 0.99 males for every female in the population. In the age range of 15–65, the ration is exactly 1 male to 1 female. The life expectancy of Gabon is lower than the world average. Gabon's population's life expectancy at birth is 53.11 years while the world average is 67.2 years as of 2010. Ethnically, the biggest group in Gabon are the Fang people with over 500,000 people, or about a third of Gabon's population, belonging to this ethnic group. The biggest religion in Gabon is Christianity, with between 55–75% of the population of Gabon being Christian.

Population

The proportion of children below the age of 15 in 2010 was 35.5%, 60.2% was between 15 and 65 years of age, while 4.3% was 65 years or older
.

Structure of the population (DHS 2012; males 19,318, females 20,636, total 39,955):

Vital statistics
Registration of vital events is in Gabon not complete. The Population Department of the United Nations prepared the following estimates. Population estimates account for under numeration in population censuses.

Fertility and births
Total Fertility Rate (TFR) (Wanted Fertility Rate) and Crude Birth Rate (CBR):

Fertility data as of 2012 (DHS Program):

Life expectancy

Other demographics statistics
Demographic statistics according to the World Population Review in 2019.

One birth every 8 minutes	
One death every 35 minutes	
One net migrant every 360 minutes	
Net gain of one person every 10 minutes

The following demographic statistics are from the CIA World Factbook.

Population
2,340,613 (2022 est.)
2,119,036 (July 2018 est.)

Religions
Roman Catholic 42.3%, Protestant 12.3%, other Christian 27.4%, Muslim 9.8%, animist 0.6%, other 0.5%, none/no answer 7.1% (2012 est.)

Age structure

0-14 years: 36.45% (male 413,883/female 399,374)
15-24 years: 21.9% (male 254,749/female 233,770)
25-54 years: 32.48% (male 386,903/female 337,776)
55-64 years: 5.19% (male 58,861/female 56,843)
65 years and over: 3.98% (male 44,368/female 44,381) (2020 est.)

0-14 years: 37.45% (male 405,676 /female 387,900)
15-24 years: 22.08% (male 245,490 /female 222,343)
25-54 years: 31.6% (male 355,348 /female 314,344)
55-64 years: 4.96% (male 54,679 /female 50,356)
65 years and over: 3.91% (male 40,721 /female 42,179) (2018 est.)

Birth rate
26.03 births/1,000 population (2022 est.) Country comparison to the world: 44th
26.5 births/1,000 population (2018 est.) Country comparison to the world: 46th

Death rate
5.67 deaths/1,000 population (2022 est.) Country comparison to the world: 175th
6.2 deaths/1,000 population (2018 est.) Country comparison to the world: 157th

Total fertility rate
3.31 children born/woman (2022 est.) Country comparison to the world: 43rd
3.52 children born/woman (2018 est.) Country comparison to the world: 42nd

Population growth rate
2.4% (2022 est.) Country comparison to the world: 28th
2.73% (2018 est.) Country comparison to the world: 15th

Median age
total: 21 years. Country comparison to the world: 186th
male: 21.4 years
female: 20.6 years (2020 est.)

total: 20.5 years. Country comparison to the world: 187th
male: 20.8 years 
female: 20.2 years (2018 est.)

Mother's mean age at first birth
19.6 years (2012 est.)
note: median age at first birth among women 20-49

Contraceptive prevalence rate
31.1% (2012)

Net migration rate
3.67 migrant(s)/1,000 population (2022 est.) Country comparison to the world: 31st
-2 migrant(s)/1,000 population (2017 est.) Country comparison to the world: 161st

Dependency ratios
total dependency ratio: 67.4 (2015 est.)
youth dependency ratio: 59.9 (2015 est.)
elderly dependency ratio: 7.6 (2015 est.)
potential support ratio: 13.2 (2015 est.)

Urbanization
urban population: 90.7% of total population (2022)
rate of urbanization: 2.27% annual rate of change (2020-25 est.)

urban population: 89.4% of total population (2018)
rate of urbanization: 2.61% annual rate of change (2015-20 est.)

Life expectancy at birth
total population: 69.7 years. Country comparison to the world: 174th
male: 67.98 years
female: 71.48 years (2022 est.)

total population: 68.1346 years (2018 est.)
male: 66.3 years (2018 est.)
female: 69.6 years (2018 est.)

Education expenditures
2.8% of GDP (2019) Country comparison to the world: 160th

Literacy
definition: age 15 and over can read and write (2015 est.)
total population: 84.7%
male: 85.9%
female: 83.4% (2018)

total population: 83.2% (2015 est.)
male: 85.3% (2015 est.)
female: 81% (2015 est.)

Unemployment, youth ages 15-24
total: 35.7% (2010 est.)
male: 30.5% (2010 est.)
female: 41.9% (2010 est.)

Major infectious diseases
degree of risk: very high (2020)
food or waterborne diseases: bacterial diarrhea, hepatitis A, and typhoid fever
vectorborne diseases: malaria and dengue fever
water contact diseases: schistosomiasis
animal contact diseases: rabies

Ethnic groups
Broad ethnic groups in Gabon are:
Bantu groups including four major groupings (Fang, Eshira, Punu, Teke)
 Other Africans, notably 'forest people' (pygmy, now sedentary) such as the Babongo tribe
 Europeans, including 10,700 French and 11,000 persons of dual nationality

2012 Census 

Source:

Language and religion

Religions:
Roman Catholic 41.9%, Protestant 13.7%, other Christian 32.4%, Islam 6.4%, Animist 0.3%, other 0.3%, None/No Answer 5% (2012 est.)

Languages:
French (official since colonial rule), Fang, Myene, Bateke, Bapounou/Eschira, Bandjabi

Literacy:
definition:
age 15 and over can read and write
total population:
83.2%
male:
85.3%
female:
81% (2015 est.)

References

Attribution:

 
Society of Gabon